Roller may refer to:

Birds
Roller, a bird of the family Coraciidae
 Roller (pigeon), a domesticated breed or variety of pigeon

Devices 
 Roller, an element of a rolling-element bearing
 Roller, used in rolling (metalworking)
 Roller, in a roller mill, to crush or grind various materials
 Roller, or training surcingle, around a horse's girth
 Roller (agricultural tool), a non-powered tool for flattening ground
 Roller (BEAM), a robot
 Rolling pin, a compacting device used for preparing dough for cooking
 Bicycle rollers, a type of bicycle trainer
 Foam roller, therapeutic exercise device
 Hair roller, used to curl hair
 Paint roller, a paint application tool
 Road roller, a vehicle for compacting
 Steamroller, a form of road roller

Arts and entertainment 
 Bay City Rollers, or the Rollers, a Scottish pop rock band
 "The Roller", a 2011 song by Beady Eye
 "Roller" (Apache 207 song), 2019
 "Roller" (April Wine song), 1978
 Roller (Goblin album), 1976
 Roller, partner of the Optimus Prime character from the Transformers universe

People with the surname 
 Andreas Roller (1805–1891), German painter and theatrical set designer
 Arnold Roller (1878–1956), a pseudonym of Stephen Naft, Austrian writer and anarchist
 Charles Roller (1879–1963), American football player and coach
 A. Clyde Roller (1914–2005), American conductor and music educator
 Duane W. Roller (born 1946), American archaeologist, author, and professor emeritus
 Edeltraud Roller (1957-2020), German political scientist
 Florian Roller (born 1992), German rower
 Gustav Roller (1895–1959), German footballer
 Jochen Roller (born 1971), German choreographer
 Joseph Roller (1929–1998), Luxembourgian footballer
 Kyle Roller (born 1988), American baseball player
 Léon Roller (1928–1993), Luxembourgian boxer
 Mihail Roller (1908–1958), Romanian communist politician
 Mileva Roller (1886–1949), Austrian painter
 Olivier Roller (born 1972), French photographer
 Philip Roller (born 1994), Thai footballer
 Steve Roller (born 1954), American athlete
 Ulrich Roller (1911–1941), putschist, stage designer and SS guard
 William Roller (1858–1949), English cricketer

Other uses 
 Apache Roller, a blog server written in Java
 Australia men's national wheelchair basketball team, or Rollers
 Roller (typeface), originally Iberica, by Carlos Winkow
 Roller printing on textiles

See also

 Roll (disambiguation)
 Rollerball pen
 List of Rolls-Royce motor cars